Yodel the Cowboy Way is a compilation recording released by the Western band Riders in the Sky on January 13, 1998.  It is available as a single CD.

For years, the fans of Riders in the Sky had requested a collection showcasing the group's yodeling talents. It was released in 1998.

Track listing
 "That's How the Yodel Was Born" (Douglas B. Green) – 2:18
 "Here Comes the Santa Fe" (Green) – 3:11
 "Cowpoke" (Jones) – 1:42
 "Riding the Winds of the West" (Green) – 2:14
 "Back in the Saddle Again" (Gene Autry, Ray Whitley) – 4:00
 "Blue Montana Skies" (Green) – 3:28
 "Singing a Song to the Sky" (Green) – 2:29
 "The First Cowboy Song" (Green, McMahan) – 2:45
 "The Yodel Blues" (Dolan, Mercer) – 2:24
 "When the Bloom Is on the Sage" (Vincent, Wright) – 3:21
 "At the End of the Rainbow Trail" (Green) – 2:10
 "Desert Serenade" (Green) – 2:59

Personnel
 Douglas B. Green (a.k.a. Ranger Doug) – vocals, guitar
 Paul Chrisman (a.k.a. Woody Paul) – vocals, fiddle
 Fred LaBour (a.k.a. Too Slim) – vocals, bass
also
 Eddie Bayers - percussion
 Louis Brown - trombone
 David Davidson - violin
 Gregg Galbraith - acoustic guitar
 Tommy Goldsmith - acoustic guitar, electric guitar
 Carl Gorodetzky - violin
 Mark Howard - acoustic guitar
 Lee Larrison - violin
 Kenny Malone - percussion
 Bob Mater - drums
 Joey Miskulin - accordion
 Weldon Myrick - steel guitar
 Richard O'Brien - acoustic guitar
 Chris O'Connell - vocals
 Woody Paul - vocals, fiddle, harmonica
 John Probst - accordion
 Kayton Roberts - steel guitar
 Pamela Sixfin - violin
 George Tidwell - trumpet
 Robby Turner - lap steel guitar
 Tommy Wells - drums
 Kristin Wilkinson - viola
 Paul Worley - guitar
 Andrea Zonn - violin, viola

References

External links
 Riders in the Sky Official Website

1998 albums
Riders in the Sky (band) albums